Amphorina viriola is a species of sea slug or nudibranch, a marine gastropod mollusc in the family Eubranchidae.

Distribution
This species was described from close to Svarte Jan lighthouse, Iddefjord, Sweden, Skagerrak, NE Atlantic.

References

Eubranchidae
Gastropods described in 2020